Mike Gottfried (born December 17, 1944) is a sportscaster and former American football player and coach.

He served as the head football coach at Murray State University (1978–1980), the University of Cincinnati (1981–1982), the University of Kansas (1983–1985), and the University of Pittsburgh (1986–1989), compiling a career college football record of 76–55–4. Gottfried played college football at Morehead State University as a quarterback from 1962 to 1965. Before moving to the college coaching ranks, he coached high school football in Ohio, tallying a mark of 50–19–1. Gottfried is the uncle of Mark Gottfried, the former head men's basketball coach at Cal State Northridge.

After coaching, Gottfried served as a college football color analyst and color commentator for ESPN from 1990 until 2007.

Gottfried's autobiography, entitled Coach's Challenge: Faith, Football, and Filling the Father Gap and co-written by Ron Benson, was released on September 11, 2007. Gottfried and his wife, Mickey, founded Team Focus in 2000, a cost-free community outreach program aimed at young men without fathers. Gottfried felt drawn to start Team Focus, because he lost his father at age 11 and understood the difficulties and hardships young men growing up without fathers.

Head coaching record

College

Notes

References

External links

1944 births
Living people
American football quarterbacks
College football announcers
Arizona Wildcats football coaches
Cincinnati Bearcats football coaches
Kansas Jayhawks football coaches
Morehead State Eagles football players
Murray State Racers football coaches
Pittsburgh Panthers football coaches
High school football coaches in Ohio